Sean Cusack (1926/27 – 30 March 2014) was a soccer player from Limerick in Ireland.

He spent his whole career at club level with his home town club, Limerick F.C. winning just one domestic honour with them, the League of Ireland Shield in 1953, scoring a penalty kick in their 3–2 win over Dundalk in the final at Oriel Park.

He represented the League of Ireland that played the Football League in April 1951.

Having played well against the English side he was called up to make his one and only appearance for the Republic of Ireland national football team on 16 November 1952 in a 1–1 draw with France at Dalymount Park.

References

External links
Details of his international appearance from soccerscene.ie

limerickfc.ie

League of Ireland players
Limerick F.C. players
Republic of Ireland association footballers
Republic of Ireland international footballers
League of Ireland XI players
Ireland (FAI) international footballers
1920s births
2014 deaths
Association football inside forwards